Executive Order 12608 was issued by Ronald Reagan on Sep 9, 1987.

History 
President Ronald Reagan issued Executive Order 12608 on September 9, 1987 as part of a general clean-up of executive orders. One part of E.O. 12608 specifically revoked the section (paragraph 1(j)) that were added to E.O. 10289 by Executive Order 11110. E.O. 11110 had been issued by President Kennedy in 1963, and is the subject of a conspiracy theory by author Jim Marrs.  As that section was the only part of E. O. 11110 that was in effect, E.O. 12608 effectively revoked the entire Order.

Impacts 
Many executive orders governing the banking and finance system of the US were either modified or effectively terminated.

External links

 Executive Order 12608 from the U.S. National Archives and Records Administration website.
 Full text of Executive Order 12608 from the Ronald Reagan archives

References

1987 in law
1987 in the United States
12608